Breach, also titled Anti-Life, is a 2020 American science fiction action horror film directed by John Suits, starring Cody Kearsley, Bruce Willis, Rachel Nichols, Thomas Jane, Johnny Messner, Corey Large, Callan Mulvey, Alexander Kane, and Kassandra Clementi. The film was shot in Fitzgerald, Georgia at TMG Studio's soundstages. It was released on December 18, 2020.

Plot
Earth is suffering an extinction level event, and 300,000 survivors are selected to board a spaceship called the Ark which will take them to a new colony called New Earth. Noah (Cody Kearsley) stows away on the Ark impersonating a junior janitor while his girlfriend Hayley (Kassandra Clementi), who is pregnant with his child is put into stasis as a passenger.

A grizzled older janitor named Clay (Bruce Willis) attempts to mentor Noah. Blue (Johnny Messner) and Shady (Johann Urb), two experienced crew members, are infected by a parasitic force. Meanwhile, Noah spies on Clay and suspects the older man is constructing a bomb. Clay shows Noah that he is brewing moonshine.

That evening the workers have an impromptu party where they talk about the loved ones they left behind. Noah tells everyone he will be reassigned to be a butcher when they reach New Earth. Ortega (Angie Pack) leaves the party to hook up with Blue and finds him welding alone. Blue turns on Ortega, killing her.

Later Clay discovers that Noah's girlfriend is Admiral Adams' (Thomas Jane) daughter. Security officer Stanley (Timothy V. Murphy) discovers Shady's decomposed body and identifies Blue as the killer. Clay finds Ortega's body; Stanley gathers a security detail and they find Blue attempting to break into the admiral's quarters. Blue suddenly leaps and kills one of the security team by biting through the officer's throat. Stanley and Teek (Callan Mulvey) are forced to shoot Blue. Chambers (Rachel Nichols) performs an autopsy on Blue's body. Teek meanwhile searches the video feed and sees a recording of Shady's death and Blue's initial infection. Chambers reports that Blue is completely hollowed out and there is a parasite loose on the ship.

Chambers discovers that Noah is not a member of the crew but a stowaway and Stanley arrests him. Clay defends Noah successfully and he is released. While the survivors discuss next steps, the three dead crewmen reanimate and attack, killing Stanley. Chambers manages to injure the remaining infected for Teek, Clay, and Noah to escape. The newly infected Stanley starts to release the infected and unlocks the remaining crew's quarters who are quickly taken over and infected.

Clay guides the survivors to the arsenal. Chambers is unable to pinpoint a weakness in the infected so Clay suggests using a flame thrower. The flame thrower sets off the fire suppression unit which ruins visibility. Lincoln (Corey Large) reunites with the group just as Teek is suddenly grabbed by the infected and pulled into the mist. Clay runs off to rescue Teek. As Teek and Clay return, Lincoln suggests using the escape pods while Teek proposes the security bay.

Lincoln flees by himself in an escape pod, but is shown not to be alone and killed offscreen. The remaining survivors get to the security bay but Stanley nabs Clay as they try and lock themselves in. Noah shoots Stanley before he can infect Clay and they barricade the door.

With 84 days until the Ark reaches New Earth the survivors try to concoct a plan to fend off the infected and save the passengers. Clay guides Noah through ducts to the Admiral, who they hope will be able to rescue them. Noah reaches the Admiral and Teek confesses to Clay and Chambers that he is responsible for everything that has transpired, and is in reality a hardline revolutionary against the repopulation of New Earth.

The Admiral awakens his security team and proposes to use stronger weapons against the infected. As the infected break into the security room, Clay and Chambers fight them off while Teek is killed. The Admiral's security team are overwhelmed; Blue chases Noah, and collapses after being splashed with cleaning fluid. As Noah attempts to relay his finding, the Admiral sacrifices himself by setting off a grenade, blowing the infected apart. Just as Chambers and Clay think it's over, the remaining body parts start to reconnect.

A stronger mutant being is formed, and the other infected enter the reactor core. Noah explains the effect of the cleaning fluid, and the group head to Clay's moonshine stash to construct better weapons. As they plan their attack, the time to arrival starts to decrease as the infected overheating the reactor. Chambers realizes that the parasite was manipulating them all along to allow them to gain access to the reactor core while Noah realizes that the parasite's plan is to wipe out the last 50 million of the human race on New Earth while wiping out the passengers at the same time with the ship. The passengers begin to turn infected. Clay sends Noah to rescue Hayley and they make their way towards an escape pod just as the mutant being attacks. Chambers is killed in the alien's first attack, and Clay attempts to hold it off but he too is overwhelmed and seemingly killed.

Noah and Hayley make for the remaining escape pod, but Noah has to separate from Hayley to start the launch sequence. He confronts the monster and manages to weaken it with his weapon. Just as Noah attempts to leave, Clay messages him from the bridge. Clay sets the Ark to self-destruct as Noah escapes with Hayley.

Noah and Hayley reach New Earth, but as they emerge from the escape pod Noah spots another human who turns out to be infected, and in the distance a huge monster is attacked by a jet fighter. As the film ends Noah raises his gun and utters "Burn 'em all".

Cast
Bruce Willis as Clay Young
Cody Kearsley as Noah
Rachel Nichols as Chambers
Kassandra Clementi as Hayley
Johnny Messner as Blue
Corey Large as Lincoln
Callan Mulvey as Teek
Alexander Kane as Commander Riggins
Timothy V. Murphy as Commander Stanley
Angie Pack as Isabella Ortega
Thomas Jane as Admiral Kiernan Adams
Swen Temmel as Fitzgerald
Ralf Moeller as Vyrl
Elicia Davies as Veronica
Johann Urb as Shady

Production
Production took place in Fitzgerald, Georgia at TMG Studios, filming for three weeks in September and October 2019.

Release
The film was released in theaters and on VOD and digital platforms on December 18, 2020.

Reception

Box office 
As of April 11, 2021, Breach grossed $39,328 in Russia and New Zealand. In its opening weekend in Russia, the film grossed $25,226 from 224 theaters, ranking ninth at the box office with an average of $112 per theater.

Critical response 

JoBlo.com gave the film a 6 out of 10, and said "This is a film that fits into a very specific sub-genre that can work under the right mindset. It's a cheap space-horror flick that's wise enough to put some very likable and charismatic actors upfront."

Accolades

References

External links
 
 

2020 films
2020 independent films
2020 science fiction horror films
2020 science fiction action films
American science fiction horror films
American science fiction thriller films
American horror thriller films
Films about extraterrestrial life
Films set on spacecraft
Canadian science fiction horror films
American science fiction action films
Films shot in Georgia (U.S. state)
Saban Films films
Canadian science fiction action films
2020s English-language films
2020s Canadian films
2020s American films